Hayden Schlossberg (born June 9, 1978) is an American screenwriter, director, and producer best known for his work on Cobra Kai (with Jon Hurwitz and Josh Heald), the Harold & Kumar films and American Reunion (with Hurwitz).

Early life
Schlossberg was born in New Jersey, to Jewish parents. Schlossberg met Jon Hurwitz when they both attended Randolph High School. Hurwitz went to the University of Pennsylvania's Wharton School, with Josh Heald who lived in the same dorm with him during freshman year.  Schlossberg frequently came to visit Hurwitz at Penn (while he was a student at the University of Chicago), and thus got to know as well. Schlossberg graduated from the University of Chicago with a degree in History in 2000. His original goal was to study law.

Career
It was during their time in college that Hurwitz and Schlossberg sold their first script Filthy to MGM. Upon selling Filthy, they moved to Hollywood to begin their career in the entertainment industry. The idea for the first Harold and Kumar film, Harold & Kumar Go to White Castle developed while they were living in Los Angeles. Schlossberg and Hurwitz decided to write a low-budget stoner film and base the main characters on their high school friends from Randolph High School. They based the character of Harold on their real-life friend Harold Lee. Hurwitz got the idea to base the film around White Castle from his own experience craving White Castle burgers when he lived in Pennsylvania for several years. At the time, Pennsylvania did not have any White Castle locations and Hurwitz had to have family members bring him frozen White Castle burgers from New Jersey. It was later followed by Harold & Kumar Escape from Guantanamo Bay and A Very Harold & Kumar 3D Christmas. They also wrote and directed the fourth theatrical entry in the American Pie franchise, American Reunion (2012).

They currently work on Cobra Kai, a continuation of The Karate Kid franchise. They created the show, along with their close friend Josh Heald. The trio serve as executive producers, show runners, writers, and directors on the series. More recently, he and his friend Jon Hurwitz, along with Josh Heald via Counterbalance Entertainment has signed a deal with Sony Pictures Television.

Filmography

See also
Jon Hurwitz
Josh Heald

References

External links 

 

1978 births
American male screenwriters
Comedy film directors
Jewish American screenwriters
Living people
People from Livingston, New Jersey
People from Randolph, New Jersey
Randolph High School (New Jersey) alumni
University of Chicago alumni
Screenwriters from New Jersey
21st-century American Jews